The 2002 WUSA College Draft took place on February 11, 2002.  It was the second college draft held by Women's United Soccer Association (WUSA) to assign the rights of college players to the WUSA teams.

Round 1

Round 2

1. The Atlanta Beat traded its second round pick (15th overall) to the New York Power for future considerations..

2.The San Jose CyberRays traded its second round pick (16th overall) to the Philadelphia Charge for future considerations.

Round 3

3. Traded with the San Diego Spirit for 2001 Waiver Draft selection and fourth round 2002 Draft selection.

Round 4

4. Traded from the Carolina Courage for 2001 Waiver Draft selection and third round 2002 Draft selection.

See also
 List of WUSA drafts

References

2002
Draft